The Argentina women's national basketball team, nicknamed "Las Gigantes" ("The Giantesses"), is administered by the Argentine Basketball Federation.


Competition results

FIBA World Championship

Pan American Games

FIBA Americas Championship

South American Championship

Current roster
Roster for the 2021 FIBA Women's AmeriCup.

References

External links
 
 FIBA profile
 Archived records of Argentina team participations

 
 
Women's national basketball teams in South America
national